Strawberry is an unincorporated community and a census-designated place (CDP) in Tuolumne County, California. Strawberry has a post office with ZIP code 95375, which opened in 1949. The 2010 United States census reported Strawberry's population was 125.

Geography
According to the United States Census Bureau, the CDP covers an area of 0.5 square miles (1.4 km2), 98.44% of it land and 1.56% of it water.

Demographics
The 2010 United States Census reported that Strawberry had a population of 86. The racial makeup of Strawberry was 82 (95.3%) White, 0 (0.0%) African American, 0 (0.0%) Native American, 0 (0.0%) Asian, 0 (0.0%) Pacific Islander, 1 (1.2%) from other races, and 3 (3.5%) from two or more races. Hispanic or Latino of any race were 7 persons (8.1%).

The Census reported that 84 people (97.7% of the population) lived in households, 0 (0%) lived in non-institutionalized group quarters, and 2 (2.3%) were institutionalized.

There were 47 households, out of which 5 (10.6%) had children under the age of 18 living in them, 22 (46.8%) were opposite-sex married couples living together, 1 (2.1%) had a female householder with no husband present, 1 (2.1%) had a male householder with no wife present.  There were 1 (2.1%) unmarried opposite-sex partnerships, and 0 (0%) same-sex married couples or partnerships. 21 households (44.7%) were made up of individuals, and 6 (12.8%) had someone living alone who was 65 years of age or older. The average household size was 1.79.  There were 24 families (51.1% of all households); the average family size was 2.46.

The population was spread out, with 11 people (12.8%) under the age of 18, 2 people (2.3%) aged 18 to 24, 13 people (15.1%) aged 25 to 44, 37 people (43.0%) aged 45 to 64, and 23 people (26.7%) who were 65 years of age or older.  The median age was 55.7 years. For every 100 females, there were 120.5 males.  For every 100 females age 18 and over, there were 114.3 males.

The homeowner vacancy rate was 12.5%; the rental vacancy rate was 16.7%.  78 people (90.7% of the population) lived in owner-occupied housing units and 6 people (7.0%) lived in rental housing units.

In popular culture

Strawberry was thought to be the original home of the fictional character Heath Barkley in the 1960s television western The Big Valley starring Lee Majors and Barbara Stanwyck. However, given the appearance of a dry desert town and closer distance from Stockton, CA on the show, Heath's home town was more likely the mining town of Strawberry Valley whose post office opened in 1850.

References

Census-designated places in Tuolumne County, California
Populated places in the Sierra Nevada (United States)
Unincorporated communities in Tuolumne County, California
Unincorporated communities in California